Serhiy Davydov (born 16 December 1984, in Ukrainian SSR, Soviet Union) is a Ukrainian amateur football striker who plays for Skif Shulhynka.

Career
He played for Metalist Kharkiv in the Ukrainian Premier League.

External links 
 
 

1984 births
Living people
People from Eskhar
Ukrainian footballers
Ukrainian Premier League players
Ukrainian First League players
Ukrainian Second League players
FC Metalist Kharkiv players
FC Metalist-2 Kharkiv players
FC Volyn Lutsk players
FC Hoverla Uzhhorod players
FC Oleksandriya players
FC Helios Kharkiv players
Association football forwards
FC Metalist 1925 Kharkiv players
Sportspeople from Kharkiv Oblast